Price Hill, West Virginia may refer to:
Price Hill, Boone County, West Virginia, an unincorporated community in Boone County
Price Hill, Fayette County, West Virginia, an unincorporated community in Fayette and Raleigh counties
Price Hill, Monongalia County, West Virginia, an unincorporated community in Monongalia County